Walk Like a Man is a 1987 American comedy film directed by Melvin Frank and starring Howie Mandel, Christopher Lloyd, Amy Steel, and Cloris Leachman. The plot concerns a young man who finally returns to his high-society family after having been raised by wolves.   It was released to theaters on April 17, 1987.

Plot
Henry Shand goes to Alaska to search for gold and find his fortune. While there, his spoiled brat of a son, Reggie, gets mad that he has to work for money. What further angers him is the fact that he has to share the dogsled with his two-year-old brother Robert, nicknamed "Bobo". Reggie decides to take matters into his own hands and pushes the toddler off the sled, leaving him to die in the wintery Klondike wilderness.

Some twenty years later, Henry has died, giving Reggie a large inheritance of thirty million dollars. Reggie foolishly spends it within a year, causing his new bride, Rhonda, to become an angry alcoholic, as they have gone broke and had to move back in with Reggie's mother, Margaret. Margaret has gone insane since Bobo's disappearance and Henry's death, and has now spent much of the family's fortune on buying homes for stray cats.

Meanwhile, a biologist named Penny arrives from Alaska, claiming to have found Bobo alive and well. They discover that Bobo has been raised by timber wolves, causing him to sniff everyone's butts, greet people by licking their faces, run on all fours, eat with his mouth rather than using flatware, growl and bark, chew on shoes, and run through fresh cement while chasing cats or fire trucks.

Reggie decides to manipulate Bobo into signing over his inheritance to him to pay off gambling debts. Reggie tells Penny that she can use Bobo for wolf research, but first must teach him to walk, talk, read, and, of course, write. Penny gives Bobo a shave and a haircut, but getting him to act like a human proves to be a difficult task, and Bobo continues to unknowingly cause problems. Things get even worse when Bobo goes out in public, wreaking havoc in a shopping mall by going into dressing rooms, unwittingly trying on clothes and walking out of stores with them.

As Bobo behaves more like a person than a dog, Penny begins to fall in love with him. Reggie wants her to speed up the training of his savage sibling, as the people he owes money to want their cash quickly. In court, Penny stands up for Bobo, having discovered Reggie's scheme. Bobo refuses to sign, and Reggie frantically engages in canine behavior—growling, barking, chewing on a squeaky toy—in an attempt to demonstrate how Bobo was acting, making him look asinine to the judge, who dismisses the case. Bobo and Penny go outside and kiss, but Bobo stops to chase a fire engine.

Cast
Howie Mandel as Robert "Bobo" Shand
Christopher Lloyd as Henry Shand (in a flashback)/Reggie Shand
Cloris Leachman as Margaret Shand
Colleen Camp as Rhonda Shand
Amy Steel as Penny
Stephen Elliott as Walter Welmont
George DiCenzo as Bob (Bub) Downs
John McLiam as H.P. Truman
Earl Boen as Jack Mollins
Howard Platt as Fred Land
Millie Slavin as Essie Welmont
William Bogert as A.J. (Al) Brown
Isabel Cooley as Judge / Bystander
Asa Lorre as Bobby Shand
Jeremy Gosch as Young Reggie

Production
The wolves in this film were uncreditedly trained by employees of Steve Earl Martin's Frazier Park, California-based cinematic and television animal sanctuary Working Wildlife. This film was an independent film, one of the first to be produced by Mandel. To this day, the budget is unknown. However, the film was also a box office bomb, grossing $460,608 at the box office.

Home video
The film was released on VHS in late 1987, and on DVD on March 2, 2004.

References

External links
 
 

1987 films
American comedy films
1987 comedy films
1980s English-language films
Films directed by Melvin Frank
Films scored by Lee Holdridge
Metro-Goldwyn-Mayer films
1980s American films